Nicolas N'Godrela (born (6 October 1984) is a New Caledonian tennis player. He won the Men's singles and Men's doubles gold medal at the 2015 Pacific Games. Apart from that, he was also part of the New Caledonian Tennis Team which won Gold at the 2015 Pacific Games Men's Team Event.

References

External links
 
 

1984 births
Living people
French male tennis players
New Caledonian male tennis players